Puddle Lane (or Tales from Puddle Lane) is a 1980s English pre-school children's television programme written by Rick Vanes with animated stories written by Sheila K. McCullagh, author of Tim and the Hidden People. A long series of early readers based on the stories was produced by Ladybird Books, also under the title Puddle Lane.

TV programme
The programme was made by Yorkshire Television in Leeds for ITV and ran on from 1985 (as a replacement for the then-recently discontinued series Mooncat & Co.) until 1989. The main characters were the Magician (played by Neil Innes, who also composed music for the programme), and a Spell Dragon named Toby (voiced by Richard Robinson); the Magician told Toby stories by moving his finger around in a puddle (when using the interior set) and a bird bath (when using the exterior set) and producing images.  He also had a cauldron inside and water barrel outside, both of which could talk. The stories he told were presented as animations, narrated by Kate Lee (who also played a minor character, Aunt Flo). The Magician lived in a large house at the end of Puddle Lane, hence the name of the programme.

In an interview in 2014, Neil Innes recalled his involvement with Puddle Lane:

Transmission guide

Series 1: 26 editions from 3 October 1985 – 1 May 1986
Series 2: 26 editions from 16 October 1986 – 23 April 1987
Series 3: 24 editions from 29 October 1987 – 21 April 1988
Series 4: 26 editions from 6 October 1988 – 13 April 1989

Books

A series of 54 books (plus two standalone volumes) was produced for Puddle Lane, published by Ladybird Books. The texts, based on the animated stories, were written by Sheila McCullagh. Illustrations for the books were provided by several different artists (Tony Morris, Gavin Rowe and others). There were five sets of books (with a different cover colour for each set), the first set (Stage 1) being the easiest to read and the last set (Stage 5) being the hardest. Since they were intended for children who are learning to read, the books with lower reading stages would present the text in two versions: the left page contained the full version, to be read aloud by the parent, while the right page contained a simplified version for the child. The books are currently out of print.

Miscellany
Other Puddle Lane merchandise included  audio tapes supplied for the books, jigsaw puzzles, dominoes, picture word cards, and several educational products: The Magician's Activity Book, The Griffle's Activity Book and Puddle Lane Fun Frieze.

References

External links 
 Puddle Lane at Little Gems General information, screenshots, complete list of episodes, title music sample available for download

1985 British television series debuts
1989 British television series endings
1980s British children's television series
British children's books
British children's animated anthology television series
British children's animated fantasy television series
Fictional populated places in England
ITV children's television shows
Series of children's books
British preschool education television series
British television shows based on children's books
British television shows featuring puppetry
1980s preschool education television series
Television series by ITV Studios
Television series by Yorkshire Television
Television series set in the 19th century
English-language television shows
Animated preschool education television series